Elizabeth (Betsy) Laura Nicholls (January 31, 1946 – October 18, 2004) was an American-Canadian paleontologist who specialized in Triassic marine reptiles.  She was a paleontologist at the Royal Tyrrell Museum in Alberta, Canada.

Early life and education
Nicholls was born in Oakland, California, and received her undergraduate degree in 1968 from the University of California, Berkeley and her graduate degrees, an M.Sc. in 1972 and a Ph.D. in 1989, from the University of Calgary, working under Samuel Paul Welles. Nichollsemys was also named in her honor.

Career
She was the co-editor with American vertebrate paleontologist Jack Murff Callaway of the book Ancient Marine Reptiles. Latoplatecarpus nichollsae was named in her honor.

Nicholls was a 2000 Rolex Awards for Enterprise laureate for exploration for her leadership in excavating the remains of a large ichthyosaur, Shonisaurus sikanniensis (Nicholls & Manabe, 2004), from the Upper Triassic Pardonet Formation in a remote area of the Sikanni Chief River in British Columbia.

Death and legacy
Nicholls died from cancer in 2004 at age 58.

On May 6, 2017 the Canadian Fossil Discovery Centre established the Dr. Elizabeth 'Betsy' Nicholls Award for Excellence in Paleontology at its annual Dig Deep Gala. The announcement was made in the presence of Nicholls' husband and children to whom a plaque was given in honour of the occasion.

Selected publications 
 Giant ichthyosaurs of the Triassic—a new species of Shonisaurus from the Pardonet Formation (Norian: Late Triassic) of British Columbia, EL Nicholls, M Manabe - Journal of Vertebrate Paleontology, 2004
 New material of Qianichthyosaurus Li, 1999 (Reptilia, Ichthyosauria) from the Late Triassic of southern China, and implications for the distribution of Triassic icthosaurs, EL Nicholls, C Wei, M Manabe - Journal of Vertebrate Paleontology, 2003
 New thalattosaurs (Reptilia: Diapsida) from the Triassic Sulphur Mountain Formation of Wapiti Lake, British Columbia, EL Nicholls, D Brinkman - Journal of Paleontology, 1993
 New material of Toxochelys latiremis Cope, and a revision of the genus Toxochelys (Testvoines, Chelonioidea), EL Nicholls - Journal of Vertebrate Paleontology, 1988
 The first record of the mosasaur Hainosaurus (Reptilia: Lacertilia) from North America, EL Nicholls - Canadian Journal of Earth Sciences, 1988
 The oldest known North American occurrence of the Plesiosauria (Reptilia: Sauropterygia) from the Liassic (Lower Jurassic) Fernie Group, Alberta, Canada, EL Nicholls - Canadian Journal of Earth Sciences, 1976

References 

Canadian paleontologists
Women paleontologists
Canadian women scientists
University of California, Berkeley alumni
University of Calgary alumni
1945 births
2004 deaths
20th-century American women scientists
People from Oakland, California
Paleontology in Alberta
21st-century American women